The Caproni Ca.124 was a 1930s single-engine Italian reconnaissance and bomber seaplane.

Design
The Caproni Ca.124 was a cantilever mid-wing monoplane of mixed construction. The fuselage was corrugated-skinned and the empennage cantilever and conventional, with the tailplane set at mid-fuselage.  The pilot's cockpit was forward of the leading edge.  It was a floatplane, mounted on metal floats each attached to the wings by pairs of N-form laterally orientated struts.

The Ca.124 was powered by a 900 hp (670 kW) Isotta Fraschini Asso XI.RC15, a water-cooled upright V-12 engine, supercharged to maintain power to 1,500 m (4,920 ft).  Bombs were contained within the fuselage, below the wing.

Specifications

References

Ca.124
1930s Italian military aircraft